Duncan Tappy (born 26 June 1984 in West Ewell, Surrey) is a professional racing driver from the United Kingdom.

Racing career

Early career
Tappy began his racing career in karting, finishing runner-up in the 2004 UK Formula Ford championship winter series. In 2005 he took part in the full UK Formula Ford season with Jamun Racing, taking ten victories to finish second in the standings. During this year he also won the end-of-season Formula Ford Festival and was selected as a finalist for the prestigious McLaren Autosport BRDC award.

In 2006 Tappy stepped up to the British Formula Renault 2.0 Championship with Jamun Racing, finishing his debut year eighteenth in the standings. He was also awarded 'Rising Star' status by the British Racing Drivers Club. He transferred to Fortec Motorsport for the 2007 season, taking sixteen podium finishes, including nine race wins, to end the year as series champion.

At the end of the season Tappy was named as British Club Driver of the Year at the annual Autosport Awards and once again nominated for the McLaren Autosport BRDC Award.

Single seater racing
Following his Formula Renault championship season, Tappy raced in a number of single-seater championships between 2008 and 2011, most notably Superleague Formula where he competed in each of the four seasons and was part of the Japan team that finished runner-up in the truncated final season. In 2010 he won the Auto GP teams title with DAMS and finished third in the driver standings. Other outings came in World Series by Renault, the Firestone Indy Lights Series and International Formula Master. In early 2008, Tappy also made two appearances as a rookie driver for A1 Team Great Britain in Mexico City and Shanghai.

Sports cars
In April 2008, Tappy made his sportscar debut when he took part in the Monza 1000km Le Mans Series event. Driving a Pescarolo Judd for Rollcentre Racing, he finished the race in seventh position.

He returned to sports car racing in 2012, competing in the Blancpain Endurance Series for ART Grand Prix alongside Grégoire Demoustier. The pair finished fifth in the Pro-Am Cup with a win in Navarre. From 2012 to 2017 he raced in a number of different GT3 championships, including further Blancpain Endurance Series campaigns, the British GT Championship, GT Asia and International GT Open.

Since the 2018 season, Tappy has competed in the LMP3 class of the Michelin Le Mans Cup, the European Le Mans Series and the Asian Le Mans Series. Partnering Michael Benham in the Michelin Le Mans Cup for Lanan Racing, he took a class win at Le Mans in 2018 and won three times in 2019, finishing runner-up in the championship. In 2020 he signed with United Autosports, and finished runner-up in the 2021 Asian Le Mans Series. He is currently competing for the team in the European Le Mans Series.

Racing record

Career summary

 † Team standings.
 * Season still in progress.

Complete Formula Renault 3.5 Series results
(key)

Superleague Formula record

2008-2009
(Races in bold indicate pole position) (Races in italics indicate fastest lap)

2009 Super Final results
Super Final results in 2009 did not count for points towards the main championship.

2010-2011

 † Non-championship event.

Complete Auto GP results
(key)

Complete European Le Mans Series results
(key) (Races in bold indicate pole position; results in italics indicate fastest lap)

Complete IMSA SportsCar Championship results
(key) (Races in bold indicate pole position; results in italics indicate fastest lap)

References

External links
Duncan Tappy official site
Duncan Tappy career details:
Q&A with Duncan Tappy

1984 births
Living people
English racing drivers
Formula Ford drivers
British Formula Renault 2.0 drivers
French Formula Renault 2.0 drivers
Formula Renault 2.0 NEC drivers
European Le Mans Series drivers
A1 Grand Prix Rookie drivers
Indy Lights drivers
Superleague Formula drivers
International Formula Master drivers
Auto GP drivers
World Series Formula V8 3.5 drivers
Blancpain Endurance Series drivers
24 Hours of Spa drivers
International GT Open drivers
Porsche Carrera Cup GB drivers
British GT Championship drivers
Asian Le Mans Series drivers
WeatherTech SportsCar Championship drivers
Fortec Motorsport drivers
RC Motorsport drivers
DAMS drivers
ART Grand Prix drivers
United Autosports drivers
De Villota Motorsport drivers
Alan Docking Racing drivers
McLaren Racing drivers
Le Mans Cup drivers
M-Sport drivers